Tony Orlando Powell (born 22 December 1972 in St Catherine, Jamaica) was a Jamaican cricketer.

He played 42 first class and 38 List A matches as a left-handed batsman and a right-arm medium fast bowler. He played mainly for Jamaica, between 1992 and 2000. He also represented Jamaica in the cricket tournament at the 1998 Commonwealth Games.

External links
Cricket Archive player profile

Living people
1972 births
People from Saint Catherine Parish
Jamaican cricketers
Commonwealth Games competitors for Jamaica
Cricketers at the 1998 Commonwealth Games
Jamaica cricketers